Kääpa may refer to several places in Estonia:
Kääpa, Jõgeva County, village in Estonia
Kääpa, Võru County, village in Estonia